In the context of transit in New York, the Green Line may refer to:

 The Babylon Branch of the Long Island Rail Road
 The Hoboken–World Trade Center route of the PATH Train
 The Howard Beach Branch of the AirTrain JFK
 The Hudson Line (Metro-North)
 Any of the New York City Subway services that use the IRT Lexington Avenue Line and its branches:
 4 Lexington Avenue Express
 5 Lexington Avenue Express
 6 Lexington Avenue Local